Rodrigo de Luna (died 1460) was a Roman Catholic prelate who served as Archbishop of Santiago de Compostela (1449–1460).

Biography
On 7 April 1449, Rodrigo de Luna was appointed during the papacy of Pope Nicholas V as Archbishop of Santiago de Compostela. He served as Archbishop of Santiago de Compostela until his death in 1460. While bishop, he was the principal consecrator of Pedro González de Mendoza, Bishop of Calahorra y La Calzada (1454).

References

External links and additional sources
 (for Chronology of Bishops) 
 (for Chronology of Bishops) 

15th-century Roman Catholic archbishops in Castile
1460 deaths
Bishops appointed by Pope Nicholas V